Flores de Mayo (Spanish for "flowers of May") is a festival held in the Philippines in the month of May. It is one of the May devotions to the Blessed Virgin Mary and lasts for the entire month.

The Santacruzan (from the Spanish santa cruz, "holy cross") is the ritual pageant held on the last day of the Flores de Mayo. It honors the finding of the True Cross by Helena of Constantinople (known as Reyna Elena) and Constantine the Great. Its connection with May stems from the May 3 date of Roodmas, which Pope John XXIII deleted in the 1960s due to the trend at the time to abolish holy days that were either duplicates or dedicated to ahistorical saints. The Feast of the Exaltation of the Cross on September 14, which commemorates the recovery of the relic by Emperor Heraclius from the Persians instead of the finding by Saint Helena combines that occasion with Roodmas in the present General Roman Calendar.

Etymology
The name of the festival is derived from the Spanish language word flores meaning "flowers." Other names are "Flores de María" ("Flowers of Mary") and "Álay" (Filipino for "offering").

In the Bicolandia
In the Bicol Region, the ritual begins with the recitation of the rosary, and the last day is simply called the "katapusan" which is marked with a Mass, a Santacruzan and procession of the Blessed Virgin Mary.

The traditional "María" with its respective meaning is said after the recitation of the Salve Regina in Spanish and the Litany of Loreto. After the ceremony, simple snacks are given to the children who attended the devotion. Alabasyón (from the Spanish for "praising") is the term for prayers sung in honor of the Holy Cross.

In Western and in some parts of Eastern Visayas
The towns particularly in Iloilo has their respective puroks or streets and the barangays which has their respective chapel or house of prayer or even in the church where an image of the Virgin Mary is venerated and children gathers to have a simple catechism and teachings about the life and story of Mary, history of Marian apparitions, Christian doctrines and values, holistic values and virtues and other life's teachings. They were also taught some prayers and some songs uniquely recited only during the Flores de Mayo and the children offer some flowers before the image of the Virgin Mary as a symbol of love, affection and veneration. This is a commemoration and reminiscent of the Our Lady of Fatima apparition to the three children which first took place on May 13 in 1917. After a while, they were offered some snacks.

Some churches and areas are giving children some paper tickets for actively participating and doing well during the catechism in which at the end of the month of May which also coincides with the end of the Flores de Mayo, the children redeem the value of the tickets which are school supplies ready for the school opening. Until 2019, this was in June, the supplies are brought currently in August or September beginning 2020, depending on the date set by the Department of Education. With the switch of the calendar, the paper ticket tradition among these children also mark one of the final salvos of the school year. Santacruzan is usually held during the last few days of May to coincide with the end of the catechism for children.

In the Katagalugan
Amongst the Tagalog people, the custom began after the proclamation of the dogma of the Immaculate Conception in 1854 and after the circa 1867 publication of Mariano Sevilla's translation of the devotional "Flores de María" ("Flowers of Mary"), also known by its longer title "Mariquít na Bulaclac nasa Pagninilaynilay sa Buong Buannang Mayo ay Inihahandog nañg mañga Devoto cay María Santísima" ("Beautiful Flowers that in the Meditations in the Whole Month of May are Presented by Devotees to Mary Most Holy").

One famous May tradition in Batangas (particularly in Lipa) is the Luglugan, or nightly devotion and party honoring the Virgin Mary. Held in structures called tuklóng, devotees offer flowers and prayers to an image of Mary every night. After the prayer, the Hermanos or Hermanas for the day will give away treats to the participants, followed by the party. The Luglugan lasts for a month until the Tapusan ("ending") which is marked with a Mass, a Santacruzan and procession of the Blessed Virgin Mary, and capped with a final Luglugan that lasts until the following morning.

The Santacruzan
A Santacruzan is a religio-historical beauty pageant held in many cities, towns, and even in small communities throughout the Philippines during the month of May. One of the most colorful aspects of this festival, the pageant depicts the finding of the True Cross by Queen Helena, mother of Constantine the Great. Many movie and television personalities participate in the events and are featured in major santacruzan. This festival became part of Filipino traditions identified with youth, love, and romance. Prior to the Santacruzan, a novena is held in honor of the Holy Cross. The procession itself commemorates the search of the Holy Cross by Reyna Elena and her son, Emperor Constantine. It is said to have roots in the joyous thanksgiving celebrations that followed the finding of the Holy Cross in Jerusalem and its translation to Constantinople (now İstanbul).

General order of the procession
The participants of this procession would follow this typical arrangement:
The Cross or the Image of Saint Helena with the Cross is used for Santa Cruzan, while the Image of Blessed Mother is used for Flores de Mayo that is the distinction of the two festivals but some organizers mixed the two festivals together in one celebration, Flores and Santa Cruzan.

Additional Titles (Pamayanan or Communities)
Each figure in this group refers to a Marian Apparition or Marian Dogma.
Pamayanan Inmaculada - She is the Representation of the Immaculate Conception. It Retells The Story of the Proclamation of the Said Dogma on December 8, 1854.
Pamayanan La Naval - She is the Representation of Our Lady of the Rosary. She Carries A Rosary. She is Included in the Santacruzan Because of its Sister Title, Reina del Santísimo Rosario, and Because of the Miraculous Story of the Victory of the Catholics Over the Turkish Moslems in the Battle of Lepanto on October 7, 1571, and the Victory of the Filipinos and Spaniards Over the Dutch on the Battle of La Naval de Manila on March 15, 1646 - October 4, 1646.
Pamayanan Asunción - She is the Representation of the Assumption of Mary. It Also Retells The Story of the Proclamation of the Said Dogma on November 1, 1950.
Pamayanan Del Carmen - She is the Representation of Our Lady of Mount Carmel Who Appeared to Saint Simon Stock in Mount Carmel in Israel on July 16, 1251. She Carries the Scapular of Mt. Carmel. She is the First Ever Title in the Santacruzan, Named After Our Lady of Mt. Carmel, Who Kept the Promise of the Mt. Carmel Scapular, Saying "Whosoever Dies, Vested in this Scapular, Shall Never Suffer Fires of Hell".
Pamayanan Dela Paz - She is the Representation of Our Lady of Peace. She Carries a Dove, Real Or Otherwise. She is Included in the Santacruzan Because of its Sister Title, Reina de la Paz, who carries the same attribute, the Dove, Symbol of World Peace.
Pamayanan Fatima - She is the Representation of Our Lady of Fatima Who Appeared to Three Children of Fátima, Portugal, Namely The Saints Francisco and Jacinta Marto, and Servant of God Sister Lúcia on May 13, 1917. She Carries A Rosary Or Wears A Crucifix Necklace.
Pamayanan Lourdes - She is the Representation of Our Lady of Lourdes Who Appeared to Saint Bernadette Soubirous in Lourdes, France on February 11, 1858. She Carries A Large Rosary.
Pamayanan Guadalupe - She is the Representation of Our Lady of Guadalupe Who Appeared to Saint Juan Diego in Guadalupe, Mexico on December 9, 1531.

Biblical and Historical Figures, with Traditional Personifications 
Matusalén (Methuselah) – He is bearded and bent with age, he rides a cart and is preoccupied with toasting grains of sand in a pan over a fire. It is an allegory of the transience of the world, which will be like the dust he is toasting.
Reina Banderada (Queen with a Banner) – She is a young lady dressed in a long red gown, bearing a yellow and/or white pennant or preferably, the Flag of Vatican City. She represents the arrival of Christianity in the Philippines.
Reina Aeta (Queen Aeta) – She is the representation of the dark-skinned indigenous peoples of the Philippines such as the Aeta and Ati. These aboriginal groups predate the ancestors of today's majority Austronesian Filipinos by tens of thousands of years. She Carries the Philippine Flag.
Reina Mora (Queen Moor) – She is the representation of the Muslim Filipinos, who are concentrated in Mindanao and large cities such as Manila. Islam arrived in the archipelago two centuries before Christianity, and is now the country's second-largest religion. Mary is also honoured in Islam, and her story is found in the 19th sura (chapter) of the Qur'an. 
Reina de Saba/Reina Sheba (Queen of Sheba) – She is the representation of the unnamed queen who visited King Solomon, and was overwhelmed with his wisdom, power, and riches. She carries a jewelry box. She is included in the Santacruzan because the Legenda Aurea describes how she venerated the beam of a bridge she was crossing, prophesying the wood's future role as part of the True Cross.
Rut y Noemi/Reina Ruth and Reina Naomi (Ruth and Naomi) – She is the Moabite convert to Judaism together with her mother-in-law, from whom she was inseparable. Ruth is an ancestress of King David, and is one of four women listed in the genealogies of Jesus in the Gospels of Matthew and Luke. These Roles Can Be Together Portrayed by One Participant or Separately Portrayed by Two Participants for Each Role.
Reina Judith (Queen Judith) – She is the representation of the Biblical widow Judith of Bethulia, who saved her city from the Assyrians by beheading their brutal general Holofernes. Also titled "Infanta" ('Princess') Judith, she carries the Decapitated Head of Holofernes in one hand and a sword with(out) the Stain of Blood in the other.
Reina Esther (Queen Esther) – She is the Jewish queen of Persia, who spared the Jewish people from the genocidal plot at the hands of Haman through timely intervention with her husband, King Xerxes. She carries a sceptre.
Cleopatra – She is the representation of Cleopatra VII Philopator (69-30 BC), the last active pharaoh of Ancient Egypt. Her male escort is often understood to represent the Roman senator and general Mark Antony (83-30 BC).
(Reina) Samaritana/Santa Photina (The Female Samaritan) – She is the Samaritan woman at the well (traditionally named Photini) with whom Christ conversed about the Water of Life. She carries a water jug on her shoulder.
Santa Verónica/Reina Verónica – She is the woman who wiped the face of Jesus who bears her Veil; in traditional Hispanic-Filipino iconography, the cloth bears three miraculous blood imprints of the Holy Face of Jesus instead of one.
Tres Marías (Three Marys) – Each Mary holds a unique attribute associated with the Entombment of Christ:
Santa María Magdalena/Reina María Magdalena (Mary Magdalene) – She bears a perfume bottle as Catholic tradition once conflated her with Mary of Bethany as the woman who anointed and wiped Jesus' feet.
Santa María Cleofe/Reina María Cleofe (Mary, the mother of James, wife of Clopas) – She bears a whisk broom, as tradition holds she swept the Holy Sepulchre before Christ was laid in it.
Santa María Salome/Reina María Salome (Mary Salome) – She bears a thurible or oil bottle, pointing to her role as a Myrrhbearer.
Reina Fé (Queen Faith) – She is the symbol of Faith, the first theological virtue. She carries a cross or crucifix.
Reina Esperanza (Queen Hope) – She is the symbol of Hope, the second theological virtue. She carries an anchor.
Reina Caridad (Queen Charity) – She is the symbol of Charity, the third theological virtue. She carries a red heart or the image of the Sacred Heart.
Reina Sentenciada (Queen Convicted) – She has her hands bound with a rope or chains of iron. She is the representation of the Early Christians, particularly virgins, who were persecuted and martyred for the Faith. She is sometimes escorted by two Roman soldiers.

Marian Titles 
Each figure in this group refers to a title of the Virgin Mary in the Litany of Loreto, or to a figure associated with her. They are preceded by adolescent or adult ladies dressed in white ball gown as angels, each holding a letter of the Angelical salutation Ave Maria.
Reina Abogada (Queen Advocate/Lawyer) – She is the defender of those who are poor and those who are oppressed, she wears a black mortarboard cap and graduation gown, and carries a large book. Her appearance is a representation of Mary, Help (Advocate) of Christians. Some processions add the Reina Doctora ("Queen Doctor") as another title connected with a degree-holding profession, and may allude to the title "Mary, Health of the Sick".
Reina Justícia (Queen Justice) – She is a personification of the title "Mirror of Justice" (Speculum Iustitiæ), her attributes are a Scale of Justice and a sword.
Divina Pastora (Divine Shepherdess) – She bears a shepherd's crook or an image of the lamb or young Sheep. She is the Representation of the Care of Jesus Christ to the Flock of Christians.
Reina de los Ángeles (Queen of the Angels) – She bears a bouquet or garland of white and/or colored flowers, and is escorted by adolescent or adult ladies dressed in white ball gown.
Luklukan ng Karunungan/Asiento de la Sabiduría (Seat of Wisdom) – She carries the Bible, and represents Mary as Sedes Sapientiæ.
Susì ng Langit/Clavé del Cielo (Key of Heaven) – She bears two keys, one gold and the other silver, adapted from the Papal arms. It is Also a Representation of the Title "Porta Coeli" ("Gate of Heaven") where Mary Welcomes Mankind to the Kingdom of God.
Reina de las Estrellas (Queen of the Stars) – She holds a wand or baston topped with a star. It can be taken as an allusion to the title Stella Maris ("Star of the Sea"), where Mary has been invoked by sailors for her protection.
Rosa Mística (Mystical Rose) – She bears a bouquet or garland of roses, a single rose, or preferably, the Barra Alta. She is the Representation of the Crown of Roses Given to the Blessed Virgin Mary.
Pusò ni María/Corazón de María (Heart of Mary) – She is the Representation of the Immaculate Heart of Mary. She holds a pink heart or the image of the Immaculate Heart of Mary.
Reina del Santísimo Rosario (Queen of the Most Holy Rosary) – She carries a large rosary, symbol of Devotion to Mary. The Philippines is Also Called Pueblo Amante de María or People in the Love of Mary Because of their Devotion to Our Lady.
Reina Luna (Queen Moon) – She is the representation of the moon, the footstool of Mary as the Woman of the Apocalypse. She carries a wand or baston topped with the crescent moon.
Reina Candelaria (Queen of Candles) – She carries a long, lit taper, symbolising the Purification of Mary, or sometimes, the Menorah, symbol of Judaism, with Seven Small candles, representing Seven Sacraments, Seven Virtues or Seven Gifts of the Holy Spirit.
Reina de la Paz (Queen of Peace) – She carries a dove, symbol of World Peace or the Holy Spirit, real or otherwise.
Reina de los Patriarcas (Queen of Patriarchs) – She bears a wooden rod or staff, symbol of Authority or Superiority. The Patriarchs are the Ancestors of the Israelites Who Lived Serving God.
Reina de los Profetas (Queen of Prophets) – she holds an hourglass or Clock, symbol of the Time: the Past, the Present, and the Future. Mary was the Queen of Prophets Because God Introduced Her to the People of God, A Long Time Ago.
Reina de los Confesores (Queen of Confessors) – she holds a scroll, whether open or closed, or a purple candle, symbol of confession, one of the Seven Sacraments.
Reina de los Mártires (Queen of Martyrs) – she bears the Crown of Thorns or a pierced heart, as a second representation of the Mater Dolorosa. She is the Representation of the Martyrs who Faced Death for the Sake of their Faith.
Reina de los Apóstoles (Queen of Apostles) – she holds the Palm of Martyrdom, symbol of triumph of Apostles and Martyrs who chose death for the sake of their faith rather than renunciation of the Christian faith.
Reina de los Santos (Queen of Saints) – She bears a golden wreath, symbol of the Crown of the Saints; often accompanied by two ladies dressed in white ball gown.
Reina del Cielo (Queen of Heaven) – She holds a flower; often accompanied by two ladies dressed in white ball gown.
Reina de las Vírgenes (Queen of Virgins) – She carries a rosary or lily, the latter signifying chastity; also escorted by two ladies dressed in white ball gown.

Prominent titles 
1. Reina de las Flores (Queen of Flowers) – She is The Queen of the Flores de Mayo. She walks under an arch festooned with the blossoms of flowers and She carries a grand bouquet of flowers.

2. Reina Elena (Queen Helena) – She is the Representation of Saint Helena herself, whose the symbol of the finding of the True Cross is the cross or crucifix that she bears in her arms. This considerably prestigious role is often awarded to the most beautiful girl or most important matron in the pageant. Some communities keep the identity of the chosen Reina Elena a closely guarded secret, revealing her identity at the Santacruzan itself. Other places are more accommodating, allowing three women to be Reina Elena.
Constantino - the escort of Reina Elena, representing her son, Constantine the Great (272 – 337 AD). Despite the Emperor having been an adult when his mother found the True Cross, this role is almost always played by a young male or even an adolescent or adult male in princely or royal garment.
3. Reina Emperatríz (Queen Empress) – She is always the last member of the procession, a representation of Saint Helena of Constantinople, specifically her title Augusta ('empress' or 'queen mother'), which she received from Constantine in 325 AD. It is Quite Wise to Take Note That It is Best to Omit the Title Reina Emperatriz Because Having So Will Duplicate the Representation of Saint Helena in the Procession. A Belief Commonly Held As to The Origin of the Two Titles Existing is the Possibility of Two Women Wanting to Portray The Most Important Role in the Procession, Thus Creating the Title Reina Emperatriz.

The procession is accompanied by the steady beat of a local brass band, playing and singing the Dios te salve (the Spanish version of the Hail Mary). Devotees bear lighted candles and sing the prayer as they walk. Due to modernization and unavailability of the brass band, It is sometimes accompanied by a speaker truck playing trending songs from the app TikTok or from the app Spotify. It is customary for males participating in the Santacruzan to wear traditional Barong Tagalog or Sometimes, Suits or Tuxedos, while females wear any Filipiniana-inspired dress or Sometimes, Renaissance-inspired or Baroque-Inspired Queen's Dress.

See also

 May Day

References

External links
 https://web.archive.org/web/20170301112727/http://www.philippines.hvu.nl/culture2.htm

Christian festivals in the Philippines
May observances
Marian devotions
Helena, mother of Constantine I